is a Japanese actor. He is associated with Watanabe Entertainment's male acting troupe D-Boys since 2010 and made his acting debut in Kaizoku Sentai Gokaiger (2011). Notable works he has also starred in include High & Low (2015), Strobe Edge (2015), Tokyo Revengers (2021).

Career
On September 19, 2010, Yamada was a finalist in the D-Boys special unit audition. He eventually joined the group's D2 division in December 2010.

In 2011, he made his acting debut as Joe Gibken in Kaizoku Sentai Gokaiger

On May 28, 2012, Yamada announced on his blog that he has been cast on manga adaption drama GTO in the role of Koji Fujiyoshi.

In 2014, Yamada landed a leading role for the first time in the movie Live directed by Noboru Iguchi. In the same year, Yamada was also cast as Tadaomy Ando in the movie Gachiban: Ultra Max. He reprised his role in Gachiban: New Generation 2 the following year.

In 2017, Yamada made his Taiga Drama acting debut in Naotora: The Lady Warlord. In addition, he also made an appearance in 14 movies within the same year. With diversity and range of roles he has took, he become known as "Chameleon Actor".

Personal life

His father is former professional baseball player Kazutoshi Yamada.

Filmography

TV drama

Film

Awards

References

External links
 Official profile 
 Official blog
 

1990 births
Living people
21st-century Japanese male actors
Actors from Aichi Prefecture
People from Nagoya